The 2008 season of the Belgian Football League (BFL) was the regular season played in the Belgium. The West Flanders Tribes had a perfect season with 8 wins and no losses and won Belgian Bowl XXI against the Brussels Black Angels by a score of 25-20. The Belgian Bowl victory was the Tribes 3rd in a row.

Regular season

Regular Season standings
W = Wins, L = Losses, T = Ties, PCT = Winning Percentage, PF= Points For, PA = Points Against

 - clinched seed to the playoffs

Post season

References

American football in Belgium
BFL
BFL